İbecik can refer to:

 İbecik, Amasya
 İbecik, Gölhisar